Isaac Thomas Parker (September 27, 1849 – March 6, 1911) was an American politician who served as the second Lieutenant Governor of Delaware, from January 17, 1905, to January 19, 1909, under Governor Preston Lea.

External links
 Delaware's Lieutenant Governors

Lieutenant Governors of Delaware
1849 births
1911 deaths
19th-century American politicians